The Lake Village Confederate Monument is located on the median of Lakeshore Drive, between Main and Jackson Streets in Lake Village, Arkansas. The marble monument depicts a Confederate Army soldier standing in mid stride with his left foot forward. His right hand holds the barrel of a rifle, whose butt rests on the monument base. He carries a bedroll draped over his left shoulder, and wears a Confederate cap. A cannon that served as a fountain was once part of the sculpture, but is now missing. The monument was erected in 1910 by two chapters of the United Daughters of the Confederacy at a cost of about $3,000.

The base has inscriptions on its east and west faces.  The east face, or rear, reads "Erected by the / Captain McConnell / and / George K. Cracraft / Chapters, U.D.C. / A.D. 1910 / And chicot county / We care not whence / They came, / Dear in lifeless clay / Whether unknown or known to fame / Their cause and country still the same / They died and wore the gray. / Father Ryan."  The west face, or front, reads "1861-1865 CSA / To the confederate of Chicot / Country, the record of whose sublime / Self sacrifice and undying devotion / Is the proud heritage / Of a loyal posterity."

The monument was listed on the National Register of Historic Places in 1996.

See also
National Register of Historic Places listings in Chicot County, Arkansas

References

1910 sculptures
Buildings and structures in Chicot County, Arkansas
Lake Village, Arkansas
Monuments and memorials on the National Register of Historic Places in Arkansas
National Register of Historic Places in Chicot County, Arkansas
United Daughters of the Confederacy monuments and memorials in Arkansas
1910 establishments in Arkansas